Bowmansville is an unincorporated community and census-designated place (CDP) in Brecknock Township, Lancaster County, Pennsylvania, United States. Bowmansville is home to a Pennsylvania Turnpike service plaza. The population was 2,077 as of the 2010 census.

History
Bowmansville was named for Samuel Bowman, an early settler.

The Bowmansville Roller Mill and John B. Good House are listed on the National Register of Historic Places.

Geography
Bowmansville is in northeastern Lancaster County, near the center of Brecknock Township. The Pennsylvania Turnpike (Interstate 76) passes through the community, but with no direct access. The closest access is at Exit 286 (Reading,  to the west near Swartzville. Pennsylvania Route 625 (Reading Road) passes through the center of Bowmansville, leading north  to Reading and south  to East Earl.

The community is drained by Muddy Creek, a west-flowing tributary of the Conestoga River, part of the Susquehanna River watershed.

Demographics

References

Census-designated places in Lancaster County, Pennsylvania
Census-designated places in Pennsylvania